Zhixue railway station is a railway station located in Shoufeng Township, Hualien County, Taiwan. It is located on the Taitung line and is operated by the Taiwan Railways Administration.

References

1911 establishments in Taiwan
Railway stations opened in 1911
Railway stations in Hualien County
Railway stations served by Taiwan Railways Administration